Tamás Meggyes (born 7 March 1967) is a Hungarian politician, who served as mayor of Esztergom between 1999 and 2010. He was also Member of Parliament for Esztergom (Komárom-Esztergom County Constituency V) in the National Assembly of Hungary from 2010 to 2014. Formerly he was also MP from Fidesz Komárom-Esztergom County Regional List from 2006 to 2010. He obtained his absolutorium in 2010 in the Kodolányi János University of Applied Sciences.

Personal life
He is married and has two children.

References

1967 births
Living people
Fidesz politicians
Members of the National Assembly of Hungary (2006–2010)
Members of the National Assembly of Hungary (2010–2014)
Mayors of places in Hungary
Politicians from Budapest
Kodolányi János University of Applied Sciences alumni